"I Wish I Knew How It Would Feel to Be Free" is a jazz song written by Billy Taylor. Taylor's original version (as "I Wish I Knew") was recorded on November 12, 1963, and released on his Right Here, Right Now! album (Capitol ST-2039) the following year.  His 1967 live version, from the album of the same name, was later used as the theme music for the Film... review programme series on BBC Television.

Taylor said: "I wrote this song, perhaps my best-known composition, for my daughter Kim."

Cover versions
The song served as an anthem for the Civil Rights Movement in America in the 1960s.
A widely played version was recorded by Nina Simone in 1967 on her Silk & Soul album.

Lighthouse Family covered it as "(I Wish I Knew How It Would Feel to Be) Free/One", a medley with U2's "One".

Other artists who have covered the song include Don Shirley (1968), Junior Mance (1968), Illinois Jacquet (1968), Solomon Burke (1968), Marlena Shaw (1969), Cold Blood (1969), John Denver (1969), Doris (1970), Mary Travers (1971), John Fahey (1976), Jools Holland (1997), The Derek Trucks Band (2006), Levon Helm (2009), John Legend and the Roots (2010), Mavis Staples with Levon Helm (2011, released 2022), Emeli Sandé (2012), and The Blind Boys of Alabama featuring Béla Fleck (2021).

The song was also covered by Andra Day for the 2018 film Acrimony.

An arrangement of the song for soprano, chorus, and orchestra by Margaret Bonds was performed by Leontyne Price with the Rust College Choir (1971).

Dionne Farris performed the song for the soundtrack of the movie Ghosts of Mississippi, released in 1996.

References

External links

1967 songs
Nina Simone songs
Television theme songs